Raitis Ivanāns (born January 3, 1979) is a Latvian former professional ice hockey forward who played in the National Hockey League (NHL)  and was known primarily as an enforcer.

Playing career

In 1997, Ivanāns came over to North America and played for the Flint Generals. In 2005, he made his NHL debut with the Montreal Canadiens, accumulating 9 penalty minutes in 4 games. He got into a fight in his second game, against the Ottawa Senators, with Zdeno Chára, and sustained a broken orbital bone due to a late punch after he was down.

On July 13, 2006, he signed a one-year deal with the Los Angeles Kings. Ivanāns scored his first NHL goal against Marty Turco the Dallas Stars on October 12, 2006. On March 18, 2007, he signed a one-year, one-way deal with the Los Angeles Kings.

On January 29, 2008, Ivanāns signed a two-year contract extension with the Kings. In each of his four consecutive seasons in Los Angeles, Ivanāns led the team in penalty minutes.

On July 1, 2010, Raitis signed a two-year deal as a free agent with the Calgary Flames, and made his Flames debut on October 7, 2010 in the 2010-11 season opening against Edmonton Oilers; however he suffered a debilitating concussion during a third period fight with Oilers' heavyweight Steve MacIntyre.

On October 20, 2011, Ivanāns was sent to the Abbotsford Heat by Calgary, where he scored his first goal of the season on November 11 against the Texas Stars.

On May 22, 2012, Ivanans signed a two-year deal with Dinamo Rīga of the Kontinental Hockey League.  During the 2012-13 season, he failed to establish a lasting role in 39 games with Riga, and was released prior to the second year of his contract.

Career statistics

Regular season and playoffs

International

Awards and honours

References

External links

Yahoo! Sports profile of Raitis Ivanāns

1979 births
Living people
Baton Rouge Kingfish players
Calgary Flames players
Dinamo Riga players
Flint Generals players
Hamilton Bulldogs (AHL) players
Hershey Bears players
Latvian ice hockey left wingers
Los Angeles Kings players
Macon Whoopee (CHL) players
Milwaukee Admirals players
Montreal Canadiens players
New Haven Knights players
Pensacola Ice Pilots players
Rockford IceHogs (UHL) players
Ice hockey people from Riga
Toledo Storm players
Tulsa Oilers (1992–present) players
Undrafted National Hockey League players